Mehran district is a neighborhood of northern Tehran. The area is named after the Mehran garden. It is located east of Shariati Avenue, west of Niavaran Expressway, north of Resalat Expressway, and southeast of Hemmat Expressway.

References
Tehran Municipality Website / Mehran Area

Neighbourhoods in Tehran